Isoptericola jiangsuensis is a Gram-positive, chitin-degrading and non-motile bacterium from the genus Isoptericola which has been isolated from beach soil near Lianyungang, China.

References

Further reading

External links
Type strain of Isoptericola jiangsuensis at BacDive -  the Bacterial Diversity Metadatabase	

Micrococcales
Bacteria described in 2010